Royal Robbins (October 21, 1788 – March 26, 1861) was an American minister.

He was son of Elisha and Sarah (Goodrich) Bobbins, and was born in Wethersfield, Connecticut.  He graduated from Yale University in 1806. On leaving College he taught school in Hadley, Massachusetts, and in Berlin, Connecticut, studied law for a time with his uncle, Hon. Asher Bobbins of Newport, Rhode Island, then prepared himself for the ministry under the tuition of Rev. Dr. Porter of Catskill, New York and Rev. Dr Yates of East Hartford, Connecticut, was licensed in 1812 by the Hartford North Association, and was ordained
June 26, 1812, colleague pastor with Rev. Dr. Upson, over the Congregational Church in Kensington, Connecticut. In this station he continued forty three years, until his dismissal June 26, 1859.

He was an industrious writer, and contributed many valuable papers to the Christian Spectator. He was the author of Outlines of History for schools, a memoir of J. G. C. Brainard, prefixed to an edition of his poems, and of an account of American Literature incorporated with Chambers' History of English Literature.

He was twice married and left a widow and six children.  He died in Berlin (Kensington parish), aged 72.

1788 births
1861 deaths
American Congregationalist ministers
People from Wethersfield, Connecticut
Yale University alumni
Writers from Connecticut
19th-century American writers
19th-century American male writers
People from Berlin, Connecticut